Miller Homestead is a historic home located near Lansing, Ashe County, North Carolina.  The house was built about 1905, and is a one-story-plus-attic frame dwelling sheathed in German siding. Also on the property is a contributing garage (c. 1930, c. 1950) and mill house / woodshed (c. 1920, c. 1935).  The property is associated with local folk musicians Charles Miller and his son Howard.

It was listed on the National Register of Historic Places in 2001.

References

Houses on the National Register of Historic Places in North Carolina
Houses completed in 1905
Houses in Ashe County, North Carolina
National Register of Historic Places in Ashe County, North Carolina
1905 establishments in North Carolina